Greek vehicle registration plates are composed of three letters and four digits per plate (e.g. ΑΑΑ–1000) printed in black on a white background. The letters represent the district (prefecture) that issues the plates while the numbers range from 1000 to 9999. As of 2004 a blue strip was added on the left showing the country code of Greece (GR) in white text and the Flag of Europe in yellow. Similar plates but of square size with numbers ranging from 1 to 999 are issued for motorcycles which exceed 50 cc in engine size.

With the exception of Athens and Thessaloniki which are represented by just the first letter of the three, all other districts are represented by the first 2 letters. The final one or two letters in the sequence changes in Greek alphabetical order after 8,999 issued plates. For example, Patras plates are ΑΧΑ–1000, where ΑΧ represents the Achaia prefecture of which Patras is the capital. When ΑΧΑ–9999 is reached the plates turn to ΑΧΒ–1000 and this continues until ΑΧΧ is finished. Only letters from the intersection of the Latin and Greek alphabets are used, specifically Α, Β, Ε, Ζ, Η, Ι, Κ, Μ, Ν, Ο, Ρ, Τ, Υ, Χ (in Greek alphabetical order). This is because Greece is a contracting party to the Vienna Convention on Road Traffic, which in Annex 2 requires registration numbers to be displayed in capital Latin characters and Arabic numerals. The rule applies in a similar way in Russia, Ukraine, Belarus, Bosnia and Herzegovina and Bulgaria.

Combinations used for overseas residents are L–NNNN (where L = letter and N = number) and are limited.  Until 2003, taxis used L–NNNN; the plate was aligned with the prefecture and the letters were colored red.

History

1911–1954
Up until 1954 Greek number plates were quite simple: black numbers on a white background, indicating the serial number shown on the car's license. These started at 1 and advanced to approximately 75-000 when the system was changed. The owner had to provide the plates and specifications were minimal: the size of the plates and numbers, as well as their respective colours. This meant that plates were not very uniform. Taxis had to indicate the initial of the city they were licensed in (e.g. "A" for Athens). In 1954 it was compulsory for all vehicles to change to a new system.

1954–1956
For just 2 years the system was L–NN, L–NNN, L–NNNN or  L–NNNNN with black characters on yellow background where L was the initial of the city they were licensed in (e.g. "A" for Athens, "Θ" for Thessaloniki etc.). All these plates display "1953–54" (the initial time period for the change, later revised) in black characters on a white background using a smaller typeface in the top left corner. These plates were compulsorily withdrawn in 1956.

1956-1972
In 1956 the system was again changed to just numbers NNNNNN. NNNNNN could be any number from one to six digits starting once again with "1" and ending this time at about "451000", though not all numbers were allocated. Characters were black on white background with a band at the top of both front and rear plates indicating city/district of registration and type of usage (private, commercial etc). Sometime after the early 60s the band on the front plate was abandoned and hence that plate became shorter in height, while the band at the rear became blue. This time it was not compulsory to change plates after 1972 when the newer system arrived. Hence these so-called "six-figure plates" can still occasionally (as of 2018) be spotted on a few old vehicles.

1973–1985
In 1972, they became lettered and the system was LL–NNNN while trucks used L–NNNN. Again, they were black characters on white background but with a new typeface. It was not compulsory to change these plates when the newer system arrived.

1984–2004
In 1984, the system changed to LLL–NNNN and the first two letters are prefecture letters (with the exception of the biggest prefectures Attica/Athens and Thessaloniki where only the first letter remained the same). Again, it was not compulsory to change to the newer "euro" plates in 2004.

2004 to present
In September/October 2004 the euroband and international country code (GR) were added to the left and the typeface changed. In all other respects the previous system LLL–NNNN continued with the numbering allocation carrying on as from pre-2004.

Historic Vehicle plates
Historic vehicle number plates can be issued for vehicles over 30 years old, after they pass the "authenticity" inspection. They came in yellow/blue, white/blue or white/orange depending on the historic vehicle organisation (FILPA or FHVE) and they consist of 4 numbers.

Prefectures (in Greek alphabetical order) 
The first 2 of 3 letters (which are listed below) of a licence plate usually represent the prefecture (nomos) where the car was registered. The almost full list of plates in Greece is below (next to the prefecture / district is its capital or an area within the prefecture that the plates are issued; some prefectures have more than one combination):

 ΑΑ Achaia prefecture – Patras
 ΑΒ Kavala prefecture – Kavala {motorcycles}
 ΑΕ Lasithi prefecture – Agios Nikolaos {motorcycles}
 ΑΖ Achaia prefecture – Patras
 ΑΗ Xanthi prefecture – Xanthi (ΑΗΗ is omitted)
 ΑΙ Aitoloakarnania prefecture – Agrinio area (ΑΙΙ is omitted)
 ΑΚ Laconia prefecture – Sparti
 ΑΜ Phokida prefecture – Amfissa
 ΑΜ [Ο, Ρ, Τ, Υ, Χ] (red letters)  tax free cars
 ΑΝ Lasithi prefecture – Agios Nikolaos
 ΑΟ Achaia prefecture – Patras {motorcycles}
 AO also used in Mount Athos in style of AO–NNN–NN.
 ΑΡ Argolis (Argolida) prefecture – Nafplio
 ΑΤ Arta prefecture – Arta
 AY Achaia prefecture – Patras {motorcycles}
 ΑΧ Achaia prefecture – Patras
 ΒΑ Magnesia prefecture – Volos {motorcycles}
 ΒΒ Magnesia prefecture – Volos {motorcycles}
 ΒΕ Piraeus prefecture {motorcycles}
 BZ Piraeus prefecture {motorcycles}
 ΒΗ Piraeus prefecture {motorcycles}
 ΒΙ Boeotia (Viotia) prefecture – Livadeia ΒΚ East Attica prefecture – Pallini 
 ΒΜ East Attica prefecture – Pallini (future use)
 ΒΝ West Attica prefecture – Elefsina (future use)
 ΒΟ Magnesia prefecture – Volos (ΒΟΡ plates were also issued for cars in Pella Prefecture due to lack of ΕΕΚ plates at that time)
 ΒΡ West Attica prefecture – Elefsina (future use)
 ΒΤ Magnesia prefecture – Volos (future use)
 ΒΥ Boeotia (Viotia) prefecture – Livadeia (future use)
 ΒΧ Piraeus prefecture {motorcycles}
 ΕΑ Dodecanese prefecture – Kos island {motorcycles}
 ΕΒ Evros prefecture – Alexandroupoli (ΕΒΒ is omitted)
 ΕΕ Pella Prefecture – Edessa 
 EE [E, I] (red letters)  tax free cars
 ΕΖ Cyclades prefecture – Ermoupoli {motorcycles}
 ΕΗ Euboea (Evia) prefecture – Chalkida {motorcycles}
 EI Euboea (Evia) prefecture – Chalkida {motorcycles}
 EK  Trucks
 ΕΚ [Α, Β, Ε]  (introduced maybe in 2003/2004, yellow colored) trucks and other vehicles used for national  transport of goods
 ΕΜ Cyclades prefecture – Ermoupoli
 ΕΡ Serres prefecture – Serres
 ΕΤ Corfu (Kerkyra) prefecture – Corfu {motorcycles}
 ΕΥ Lefkada prefecture – Lefkada (ΕΥΑ plates were also issued in Rodos Island due to lack of ΡΟΝ plates at that time)
 ΕΥ [Υ]  tax free cars of offshore companies
 ΕΧ Kilkis prefecture – Kilkis (future use)
 ΖΑ Zakynthos prefecture – Zakynthos
 ΖΒ Zakynthos prefecture – Zakynthos (future use)
 ΖΕ Thessaloniki prefecture (future use)
 ΖΖ Athens prefecture
 ΖΗ Athens prefecture
 ΖΙ Thessaloniki prefecture (future use)
 ΖΚ Athens prefecture
 ΖΜ Athens prefecture
 ΖΝ Piraeus prefecture
 ΖΟ Thessaloniki prefecture (future use)
 ΖΡ Piraeus prefecture {motorcycles}
 ΖΤ West Attica prefecture – Elefsina {motorcycles}
 ΖΥ East Attica prefecture – Pallini
 ΖΧ East Attica prefecture – Pallini
 ΗΑ Ilia prefecture – Pyrgos
 ΗΒ Athens prefecture {motorcycles}
 ΗΕ Ilia prefecture – Pyrgos {motorcycles}
 ΗΖ Heraklion prefecture – Heraklion 
 ΗΗ Heraklion prefecture – Heraklion {motorcycles}
 ΗΙ Heraklion prefecture – Heraklion {motorcycles}
 ΗΚ Heraklion prefecture – Heraklion (ΗΚΗ and ΗΚΖ plates were also issued in nearby Chania Prefecture due to lack of ΧΝΜ plates at that time)
 ΗΜ Imathia prefecture – Veria
 ΗΝ Thesprotia prefecture – Igoumenitsa
 ΗΟ Xanthi prefecture – Xanthi {motorcycles}
 ΗΡ Heraklion prefecture – Heraklion
 ΗΤ Xanthi prefecture – Xanthi (future use)
 ΗΥ Phthiotis (Fthiotida) prefecture – Lamia (future use)
 ΗΧ Imathia prefecture – Veria (future use)
 ΙΑ Trucks
 ΙΑ [Α, Β, Ε] (yellow colored)  trucks used for international transport
 ΙΒ Athens prefecture
 ΙΕ Athens prefecture
 ΙΖ Athens prefecture
 ΙΗ Athens prefecture (IHA plates were also issued for cars in Euboea Prefecture due to lack of XAI plates at that time)
 ΙΙ Ioannina prefecture – Ioannina (future use)
 ΙΚ Athens prefecture
 ΙΜ Athens prefecture
 ΙΝ Ioannina prefecture – Ioannina
 ΙΟ Athens prefecture
 ΙΡ Athens prefecture {not solely for motorcycles as previously stated}
 ΙΤ Athens prefecture 
 ΙΥ Athens prefecture
 ΙΧ Serres prefecture
 ΚΑ Karditsa prefecture – Karditsa (ΚΑΑ is omitted)
 ΚΒ Kavala prefecture – Kavala (ΚΒΒ is omitted)
 ΚΕ Kefalonia and Ithaca prefecture – Argostoli (KEE is omitted)
 ΚΖ Kozani prefecture – Kozani (ΚΖΖ is omitted)
 ΚΗ Evrytania prefecture – Karpenisi
 ΚΗ [Ι, Ο, Υ] (orange colored)  state cars
 ΚΙ Kilkis prefecture – Kilkis
 ΚΚ Rhodope prefecture – Komotini {motorcycles}
 ΚΜ Messinia prefecture – Kalamata
 ΚΝ Pieria prefecture – Katerini (ΚΝΖ is omitted)
 ΚΟ Rhodope (Rodopi) prefecture – Komotini (exceptions ΚΟΗ and ΚΟΚ – Thessaloniki prefecture, ΚΟΡ – Heraklio prefecture {motorcycles})
 ΚΡ Corinthia prefecture – Corinth (Korinthos)
 ΚΤ Kastoria prefecture – Kastoria
 ΚΤ [Ι, Ο, Τ] (red letters) tax free cars
 ΚΤ [Υ] (orange colored) state cars
 ΚΥ Corfu (Kerkyra) prefecture – Corfu
 ΚΧ Dodecanese prefecture – Kos island (ΚΧΑ plates were also issued for cars in Rodos Island due to lack of ΡΟΖ plates at that time)
 ΚΧ [O, Υ, X]  (red letters) tax free cars
 ΜΑ Chalkidiki prefecture – Polygyros (future use)
 ΜΒ Samos prefecture – Samos (future use)
 ΜΕ Aitoloakarnania prefecture – Messolongi
 ΜΖ Messinia prefecture – Kalamata {motorcycles}
 ΜΗ Lesvos prefecture – Myrina (Limnos island)
 MH [Ι, Ο, Υ] (red letters)  tax free cars
 ΜΙ Phthiotis (Fthiotida) prefecture – Lamia
 ΜΚ Karditsa prefecture – Karditsa (future use)
 ΜΜ Pella Prefecture – Edessa (future use)
 ΜΝ Kozani prefecture – Kozani
 ΜΟ Samos prefecture – Samos (ΜΟΚ, ΜΟΜ and ΜΟΡ plates for motorcycles were also issued in Rodos Island due to lack of ΡΚΜ plates at that time)
 ΜΟ [Ι, Ο, Υ] (red letters)  {tax free cars}
 ΜΡ Laconia prefecture – Sparti (future use)
 ΜΤ Lesbos prefecture – Mytilini {motorcycles}
 ΜΥ Lesbos (Lesvos) prefecture – Mytilini (ΜΥΖ plates were also issued for cars in Rodos Island due to lack of ΡΟΜ plates at that time)
 ΜΧ Evros prefecture – Alexandroupoli (future use)
 ΝΑ Thessaloniki prefecture – Thessaloniki
 ΝΒ Thessaloniki prefecture – Thessaloniki
 ΝΕ Thessaloniki prefecture – Thessaloniki
 ΝΖ Thessaloniki prefecture – Thessaloniki
 ΝΗ Thessaloniki prefecture – Thessaloniki
 ΝΙ Thessaloniki prefecture – Thessaloniki
 ΝΚ Thessaloniki prefecture – Thessaloniki 
 ΝΜ Thessaloniki prefecture – Thessaloniki {motorcycles}
 ΝΝ Thessaloniki prefecture – Thessaloniki {motorcycles}
 ΝΟ Thessaloniki prefecture – Thessaloniki {motorcycles}
 ΝΡ Thessaloniki prefecture {motorcycles}
 ΝΤ Thessaloniki prefecture (future use)
 ΝΥ Thessaloniki prefecture (future use)
 NX Thessaloniki prefecture (future use)
 ΝΧ Trucks
 ΝΧ [Α, Υ] (yellow colored)  {trucks for transport of goods in a prefecture}
 ΟΑ Athens {motorcycles}
 ΟΒ Athens {motorcycles}
 ΟΕ Athens {motorcycles}
 ΟΖ Athens (future use)
 ΟΗ Athens {motorcycles}
 ΟΙ Athens {motorcycles}
 ΟΚ Athens {motorcycles}
 ΟΜ Athens {motorcycles}
 ΟΝ Athens {motorcycles}
 ΟΟ Athens {motorcycles}
 ΟΡ Evros prefecture – Orestiada area
 ΟΤ Athens (future use)
 ΟΥ Athens {motorcycles}
 ΟΧ Athens (future use)
 ΡΑ Florina prefecture – Florina (ΡΑΑ is omitted)
 ΡΑ [Ι, Ο, Υ] (red letters)  tax free cars
 ΡΒ Corinthia prefecture – Corinth (future use)
 ΡΕ Rethymno prefecture – Rethymno (ΡΕΕ appears not to have been omitted as previously stated)
 ΡΖ Preveza prefecture – Preveza (ΡΖΒ is omitted)
 ΡΗ Rethymno prefecture – Rethymno {motorcycles}
 ΡΙ Larissa prefecture – Larissa
 ΡΚ Dodecanese prefecture – Rodos (Rhodes) 
 ΡΜ Drama prefecture – Drama (ΡΜΖ is omitted)
 ΡΝ Grevena prefecture – Grevena
 ΡΝ [Ι, Μ, Ν, Ο, Ρ] (red letters)  trucks
 ΡΟ Dodecanese prefecture – Rhodes (Rodos)
 ΡΡ Larissa prefecture – Larissa
 ΡΤ Larissa prefecture – Larissa (future use)
 ΡΥ Dodecanese prefecture – Rodos (Rhodes) {motorcycles}
 ΡΧ Dodecanese prefecture – Rodos (Rhodes) (future use)
 ΤΑ Taxis
 ΤΑ [Α, Β, Ε, Ζ, Η] (marked in yellow)  taxis
 ΤΒ Corfu (Kerkyra) prefecture – Corfu {motorcycles}
 ΤΕ Corfu (Kerkyra) prefecture – Corfu (future use)
 ΤΖ Piraeus prefecture {motorcycles}
 ΤΗ Aitoloakarnania prefecture – Agrinio area (future use)
 ΤΙ Pieria prefecture – Katerini (future use)
 ΤΚ Trikala prefecture – Trikala
 ΤΜ Argolis (Argolida) prefecture – Nafplio {motorcycles}
 ΤΝ Trikala prefecture – Trikala (future use)
 ΤΟ Drama prefecture – Drama (future use)
 ΤΡ Arcadia prefecture – Tripoli
 ΤΤ Rhodope prefecture (future use)
 ΤΥ Chania prefecture – Chania {motorcycles}
 ΤΧ Preveza prefecture – Preveza (future use)
 ΥΑ Athens prefecture
 ΥΒ Athens prefecture
 ΥΕ Athens prefecture
 ΥΖ Athens prefecture
 ΥΗ Athens prefecture (YHA plates were also issued for cars in Euboea Prefecture due to lack of XAN plates at that time)
 ΥΙ Piraeus prefecture
 ΥΚ Piraeus prefecture
 ΥΜ Piraeus prefecture
 ΥΝ Piraeus prefecture
 ΥΟ West Attica prefecture – Elefsina
 ΥΡ West Attica prefecture – Elefsina
 ΥΤ West Attica prefecture – Elefsina
 ΥΥ East Attica prefecture – Pallini
 ΥΧ East Attica prefecture – Pallini
 ΧΑ Euboea (Evia) prefecture – Chalkida 
 ΧΒ Chania prefecture – Chania {motorcycles}
 ΧΕ Athens prefecture {now used for both motorcycles and cars}
 ΧΖ Athens prefecture {motorcycles}
 ΧΗ Athens prefecture {motorcycles}
 ΧΙ Chios prefecture – Chios
 ΧΚ Chalkidiki prefecture – Polygyros 
 ΧΜ Athens prefecture (future use)
 ΧΝ Chania prefecture – Chania (ΧΝΟ were skipped for cars, but were used for motorcycles)
 ΧΟ Chios prefecture – Chios {motorcycles}
 ΧΡ Athens prefecture {motorcycles}
 ΧΤ Athens prefecture {motorcycles}
 ΧΥ Athens prefecture {motorcycles}
 ΧΧ Athens prefecture {motorcycles}

Special plates 

Vehicles that belong to public services and armed forces use special license plates with the following letter combinations followed by numbers: 

 ΑΙΑ (Athens International Airport service vehicles) — (white coloured with black lettering)
 ΑΝ.Π. — Disabled in war (blue coloured with white lettering; same look as diplomatic plates)
 ΔΟΚ — Test plates – (issued to dealers when specific criteria are met: can be used interchangeably on all cars in dealers stock which don’t have normal number plates)
 ΔΣ  — Corps Diplomatique or foreign delegation (e.g. ΔΣ 48 CD, ΔΣ 48–1 CD) (blue-coloured)
 Ε.Α. or ΕΛ.ΑΣ.  — Hellenic Police
 ΛΣ  — Coast Guard
 ΞΑ  — Foreign missions (orange coloured)
 ΕΣ  — Hellenic Army
 ΠΑ  — Hellenic Air Force
 ΠΝ  — Hellenic Navy
 ΠΣ  — Fire Guard
 ΠΚ  — President of the Government, i.e. the Prime Minister of Greece

The following categories are conflicting: The same letter combinations are used for both public services and specific regions:

 ΑΜ  — Agricultural vehicles
 ΚΥ  — State
 ΜΕ  — Public works vehicles (yellow coloured)

For truck trailers over 3.5 tonnes without a prime mover:

The letter P followed by a hyphen and 5 or 4 numerals is used.

References

External links 

 Francoplaque Photos – Greece
 License Plates of the World – Greece
 Olav's License Plate Pictures – Number plates of Greece
 Matriculasdelmundo - Greece

Transport in Greece
Greece
Greece transport-related lists
 Registration plates